Skelmanthorpe railway station is a station in West Yorkshire, England, that was previously part of the national rail network, and is now a station on the minimum-gauge Whistlestop Valley.

History
The station was opened in 1879 by the Lancashire & Yorkshire Railway.

References 
 https://web.archive.org/web/20080612172729/http://www.kirkleeslightrailway.com/content/home.php
 http://www.disused-stations.org.uk/s/skelmanthorpe/

Heritage railway stations in Kirklees
Former Lancashire and Yorkshire Railway stations
Beeching closures in England
Railway stations in Great Britain opened in 1879
Railway stations in Great Britain closed in 1983
Railway stations in Great Britain opened in 1992
railway station